San Francisco Ballet dances each year at the  War Memorial Opera House, San Francisco, and tours; this is the list of ballets with casts for the 2012 season beginning with the gala, Wednesday, January 19, 2012,  The Nutcracker is danced the year before.

Gala

Wednesday, January 26, 2012

notes for gala

Program one, January 27 – February 3 Full-length
 Onegin

Program two, February 14 – February 25  Mixed bill
 Chroma
 Beaux
 Number Nine©

Program three,February 16 – February 26 Mixed bill
 Le Carnaval des Animaux
 Francesca da Rimini
 Trio

Program four, March 6 – March 11 Full-length
 Romeo & Juliet

Program five, March 21 - April 1 Mixed program
 The Fifth Season
 Symphonic Dances, an Edwaard Liang world premiere
 Glass Pieces

Program six, March 23 - April 3 Mixed program
 Raymonda - Act III
 RAkU
 Guide to Strange Places, an Ashley Page World Premiere Program seven, April 12 - April 18 Mixed program
 Divertimento No. 15 Scotch Symphony The Four Temperaments Program eight, April 27 - May 6 Full-length
 Don Quixote''

External links 
 

San Francisco Ballet
Lists of ballets by company
Ballet
2012 in San Francisco